Granny Squirrel Branch is a  long 1st order tributary to Harris Creek in Cherokee County, North Carolina.  Granny Squirrel Branch is the only stream of this name in the United States and is a tributary to Harris Creek.

According to tradition, "Granny Squirrel" was originally the name of an elderly Native American Indian woman who lived in the area.

Course
Granny Squirrel Branch rises in Granny Squirrel Gap in Cherokee County, North Carolina and then flows north to join Harris Creek about 0.25 miles southwest of Rhodo, North Carolina.

Watershed
Granny Squirrel Branch drains  of area, receives about 66.97 in/year of precipitation, and has a wetness index of 248.46 and is about 77% forested.

References

Rivers of North Carolina
Rivers of Cherokee County, North Carolina